Gulshan Ara Akter Champa (born 5 January 1965) is a Bangladeshi film and television actress. She won Bangladesh National Film Award for Best Actress three times for the films Padma Nadir Majhi (1993), Anya Jibon (1995) and Uttarer Khep (2000), and the Best Supporting Actress award for  Shasti (2005) and Chandragrohon (2008). As of January 2019, she has acted over 200 films.

Early life
Champa's mother died when she was 10. Champa is the younger sister of actresses Bobita and Shuchanda.

Career

Television
Champa started her career in 1981 with the BTV drama Dub Satar, directed by Abdullah Al Mamun. She soon received offers for other dramatic roles, and appeared in Sahabjadir Kalo Nekab, Akash Bariye Dao, Khola Daroja, Ekti Joddo Anno Ekti Meye, Apoya, Ekhane Nongor, and others.

Film
Champa debuted acting in films by Tin Kanya (1986), directed by Shibli Sadik. This film was produced by her sister Shuchanda, and all three sisters - Shucanda, Babita, and Champa, performed in the film. Champa played the role of a police inspector.

Personal life

Champa married businessman Shahidul Islam Khan in 1982. Together they have a daughter, Esha.

Works

Filmography

Television appearances
Single appearances
 Buro Shaliker Ghare Row (2010)
 Sedin Tarabanu Aj Tarabanu (2013)

Serials
 Bazpakhi (2003)
 Second Innings (2013)

Telefilms
 Exclusive Interview
 Atopor Bhalobasha (2013)

References

External links
 

Living people
20th-century Bangladeshi actresses
Bangladeshi film actresses
21st-century Bangladeshi actresses
Bangladeshi television actresses
Best Actress National Film Awards (Bangladesh) winners
Best Supporting Actress Bachsas Award winners
Best Supporting Actress National Film Award (Bangladesh) winners
Best Editor National Film Award (Bangladesh) winners
1965 births